Mayne, is a civil parish in County Westmeath, Ireland.

Mayne is one of 8 civil parishes in the barony of Fore in the Province of Leinster.

Mayne civil parish comprises the village of Coole and 19 townlands: Ballinealoe, Carn, Clonteens, Coole (townland), Coolure Demesne, Derrya, Fearmore, Lickny, Lispopple, Mayne, Monktown, Newtown, Nonsuch, Packenhamhall or Tullynally, Portjack, Shrubbywood, Simonstown, Tullynally or Pakenhamhall, Turbotstown, Williamstown.

The neighbouring civil parishes are: Lickbla to the north, Rathgarve to the east, Faughalstown to the south and Street to the west.

References

External links
Mayne civil parish at the IreAtlas Townland Data Base
Mayne civil parish at townlands.ie
Mayne civil parish at The Placename Database of Ireland

Civil parishes of County Westmeath